Vivienne Dick (born 1950) is an Irish feminist experimental and documentary filmmaker.  Her early films helped define the No Wave scene. According to The Irish Times, Dick is "one of the most important film-makers Ireland has produced".

Biography 
Dick was born in Donegal and grew up in Ireland during the 1950s, attending University College Dublin there in the 1960s. After travels in Europe, India and Mexico, she emigrated to the United States in the 1975. She relocated to London in the mid-1980s and returned to Ireland in the mid-1990s. Dick currently lives in Galway and teaches filmmaking at Galway-Mayo Institute of Technology.

Career 
Upon her arrival in the U.S., Dick became an integral figure in No Wave film culture and produced a series of seminal Super8 short films.  Living in New York, which was undergoing a recession and an inexpensive place to live, many of her films were staged around well-known sites such as Coney Island, the Statue of Liberty, and the World Trade Center. The films featured punk performers such as Lydia Lunch, Pat Place (of the band Bush Tetras) and Adele Bertei (of The Contortions). Film critic and author J. Hoberman has called Dick the "quintessential No Wave filmmaker".

After leaving the United States, Dick's work took on a more political tone. She was an active member of the London Filmmakers Coop during her time in the city. Her 2014 film, The Irreducible Difference of the Other, acknowledges her longstanding interest in Luce Irigaray. Her work is examined in the 2010 documentary Blank City, which discusses the No Wave movement. Her name appears in the lyrics of the Le Tigre song "Hot Topic."

Dick's work formed part of two major retrospectives of American avant garde film: No Wave Cinema 1978-87 (1996) at the Whitney Museum, New York and Big as Life: An American History of Super8 Film (1999) at the Museum of Modern Art, New York and the Philadelphia Museum of Art. Vivienne's work was the subject of a retrospective at the Crawford Arts Centre, with an accompanying monograph co-published by the Crawford Arts Centre and the LUX Tate Modern, London in late 2010. It included a collection of her remarkable films and included a performance by Lydia Lunch as well as discussions with Nan Goldin, Claire Pajaczkowska, and Maeve Connolly, as well as films by other artists selected by Dick.

"In 2017 IMMA presented 93% STARDUST, a survey exhibition of Dick’s work."

Films 

 DVD, Afterimages 4 : Vivienne Dick, Lux. Comprenant : Guerillére Talks, 1978, 24 min; She Had Her Gun Already, 1978, 28 min; Staten Island, 1978, 4 min.
2016. Felis Catus, 5:30 min
2015. Red Moon Rising, 15:00 min
2013. The Irreducible Difference of the Other
2005. Molecular Moments
2004. Saccade
2002. Excluded by the Nature of Things, DVD pour trois écrans
1999. Two Be Two
1994. A Skinny Little Man Attacked Daddy
1992. New York Conversations
1990. Two Pigeons
1989. London Suite
1988. Images : Ireland
1988. Pobal-Portrait of an Artist
1986. Rothach
1983. Trailer
1983. Like Dawn to Dusk
1982. Loisaida
1981. Visibility: Moderate
1980. Liberty's Booty
1979. Beauty Becomes the Beast
1978. She Had Her Gun All Ready
1978. Staten island
1978. Guerillere Talks

References

External links
 
 Excluded by the Nature of Things? Irish Cinema and Artist's Film, CIRCA, 106, Winter 2003, pp. 33–39.
 From no wave to national cinema: the cultural landscape of Vivienne Dick's early films (1978-1985), Maeve Connolly, National Cinema and Beyond, Four Courts Press 2004, 61–73.

1950 births
Living people
American women film directors
American film directors
Irish women film directors
Irish film directors
Punk filmmakers
American experimental filmmakers
Irish experimental filmmakers
No wave
Film people from Dublin (city)
Aosdána members
Women experimental filmmakers
Irish contemporary artists
21st-century American women
Women in punk